Kingsburg is an unincorporated community in Florence County, South Carolina, United States.  The community is located at the intersection of US 378, SC 41, SC 51 and River Road (S-21-57), in southeastern Florence County.  Wedged between the Great Pee Dee River and Lynches River, the area is a predominantly farming community.

References

Unincorporated communities in Florence County, South Carolina
Unincorporated communities in South Carolina